Aldo Baito (4 January 1920 – 20 December 2015) was an Italian racing cyclist. He won stage 9 of the 1946 Giro d'Italia.

References

External links
 

1920 births
2015 deaths
Italian male cyclists
Italian Giro d'Italia stage winners
Cyclists from the Province of Varese
20th-century Italian people